Jackson is a city in and the county seat of Jackson County, Ohio, United States approximately 27 mi (43 km) SE of Chillicothe. The population was 6,239 at the 2020 census.

History 

Established in 1817, residents named the town after Andrew Jackson, a hero of the War of 1812, and an eventual president of the United States. The community grew slowly, having only 297 inhabitants in 1840. In 1846, Jackson contained four churches, about seven stores, and a single newspaper office. Over the next 40 years, the town grew quickly, attaining a population of 3,021 people in 1880. By 1880, two railroad lines passed through the community, helping to spur economic and population growth. In 1886, two newspaper offices, eight churches, and two banks existed in Jackson. The largest businesses in the town were the Star Furnace Company and the Globe Iron Company, with 30 employees apiece. Both firms used local coal and iron ore deposits to make iron products.

Jackson continued to grow during the 20th century. Jackson was the county's largest community in 2000, with a population of 6,184 people. This number amounted to roughly 20% of the county's entire population. Today, many locals find employment in a General Mills plant in nearby Wellston, Ohio, which employs more than 1000 people.

Geography

Public lands 
Parks include Eddie Jones Park, Manpower Park, and McKinley Park. The city operates the Fairmount Cemetery. The Lillian E. Jones museum is housed in a house built in 1869. Hammertown Lake, the city reservoir, has picnic areas and fishing.

Climate

Demographics

Jackson has the eighth largest population of people of Welsh descent in the United States, and fourth largest in Ohio. The Welsh-American Heritage Museum in Oak Hill describes the experience of Welsh immigration to this area and their chief occupations in farming, making iron, and manufacturing clay.

2010 census
As of the census of 2010, there were 6,397 people, 2,734 households, and 1,698 families living in the city. The racial makeup of the city was 96.4% White, 0.7% African American, 0.3% Native American, 0.4% Asian, 0.4% from other races, and 1.7% from two or more races. Hispanic or Latino of any race were 1.5% of the population.

There were 2,734 households, of which 32.3% had children under the age of 18 living with them, 40.5% were married couples living together, 17.2% had a female householder with no husband present, 4.4% had a male householder with no wife present, and 37.9% were non-families. 33.5% of all households were made up of individuals, and 14.2% had someone living alone who was 65 years of age or older. The average household size was 2.32 and the average family size was 2.94.

The median age in the city was 38.1 years. 23.8% of residents were under the age of 18; 9.6% were between the ages of 18 and 24; 26% were from 25 to 44; 26% were from 45 to 64; and 14.7% were 65 years of age or older. The gender makeup of the city was 46.5% male and 53.5% female.

2000 census
As of the census of 2000, there were 6,184 people, 2,667 households, and 1,712 families living in the city. The population density was 823.4 people per square mile (317.9/km2). There were 2,905 housing units at an average density of 386.8 per square mile (149.4/km2). The racial makeup of the city was 98.19% White, 0.44% African American, 0.19% Native American, 0.26% Asian, 0.03% Pacific Islander, 0.29% from other races, and 0.60% from two or more races. Hispanic or Latino of any race were 0.86% of the population.

There were 2,667 households, out of which 30.9% had children under the age of 18 living with them, 45.8% were married couples living together, 14.2% had a female householder with no husband present, and 35.8% were non-families. 32.4% of all households were made up of individuals, and 14.6% had someone living alone who was 65 years of age or older. The average household size was 2.32 and the average family size was 2.91.

In the city the population was spread out, with 24.7% under the age of 18, 8.9% from 18 to 24, 27.8% from 25 to 44, 22.2% from 45 to 64, and 16.3% who were 65 years of age or older. The median age was 38 years. For every 100 females, there were 85.1 males. For every 100 females age 18 and over, there were 80.3 males.

The median income for a household in the city was $26,728, and the median income for a family was $33,456. Males had a median income of $31,131 versus $21,612 for females. The per capita income for the city was $14,855. About 14.6% of families and 18.7% of the population were below the poverty line, including 23.6% of those under age 18 and 18.4% of those age 65 or over.

Education
Jackson City Schools operates three elementary schools, one middle school and Jackson High School.

The city has Jackson City Library, a public lending library.

Notable people 
 Frank Crumit, singer, songwriter, half of the "Swinging Sweethearts"
 Homer Marshman, first owner of the NFL's Rams franchise
 John Wesley Powell, explorer of the Grand Canyon and other western lands
 Nicole Riegel, writer/director of Holler, which was based on and filmed in Jackson
 Effie Hoffman Rogers, educator
 Fletcher Benton, sculptor and painter
 Allen McKenzie, musician for FireHouse
 Stan Arthur, Vice Chief of Naval Operations, Officer in U.S Navy

See also
 Jackson County Apple Festival

References

External links

 City of Jackson

 
1817 establishments in Ohio
Populated places established in 1817
Cities in Jackson County, Ohio
County seats in Ohio
Cities in Ohio